Rokot Airport  is an airport in Sipura, West Sumatra. Currently, only small body aircraft can land at the airport.

The airport was completed in 1980 with a runway size of 900 x 23 m. However, the airport is now threatened by possible submersion. Erosion near the shoreline, a mere 25 meters away, means that only 800 meters of runway are still usable. In addition to this, stone from the eroded runway is being carried away by surrounding communities for the construction of houses.

Airlines and destinations

References

Airports in Sumatra
Buildings and structures in West Sumatra
Transport in West Sumatra